Everybody Out! is a rock band formed in 2007 by former Dropkick Murphys guitarist Rick Barton and former The Dead Pets and Lost City Angels frontman Sweeney Todd. Despite Sweeney Todd being from the UK, the band is primarily based in Boston, Massachusetts. The duo personally financed the release of 2 EPs before signing to Taang! Records. Their eponymous debut LP was released on April 8, 2008. Various friends and musicians contributed to the record but the band's most current lineup is Barton and Todd, along with Mike McMillen (lead guitar), Sean Laforce (bass), and Kevin Garvin (drums), all previously from the Boston area Metalcore band On Broken Wings.  Recently, Sweeney Todd has left the band.  While rumors fly as to who his replacement will be, no one has been announced at this time.

Discography

Studio albums
Everybody Out! (2008)

EPs
"Everybody Out! E.P." (2007)
"Struggle & Strife" (2008)

Punk rock groups from Massachusetts